Victoria Hamilton-Barritt (born 8 May 1982) is an English actress and singer known primarily for her roles in musical theatre She previously played the role of Inez in The View UpStairs at the Soho Theatre, London.

Background 

Victoria Hamilton-Barritt was born to a father of Italian and German descent and a mother of Anglo-Indian and Persian descent in North West London. She studied at Central School of Ballet and the Urdang Academy, Covent Garden, London.

Musical theatre 

Upon graduating in 2001, Hamilton-Barritt was cast in the musical Oh What a Night! playing the role of Cat for the 2001 UK tour, continuing with the show in Hamburg, Germany from January to June 2002. She finished off the tour with a one-month residency at The Sporting Club in Monte Carlo where she also understudied Sheila Ferguson in the role of Roxy Rochelle. In 2002, she played the role of Connie in the Saturday Night Fever Scandinavian Arena Tour.

Hamilton-Barritt's West End debut in came in 2003 with Mamma Mia!, where she understudied the role of Lisa. She then returned to Saturday Night Fever in the original cast 2004 UK tour, this time playing the leading role of Stephanie Mangano. From September 2004 to September 2005 she returned to the West End to play the leading role of Carmen Diaz in Fame at the Aldwych Theatre. She played the role of Anita in the 2006 international tour of West Side Story visiting Germany, Japan and Thailand. In 2007 she performed the role of Maria, understudying the leading role of Susan, in the first production of Desperately Seeking Susan at the Novello Theatre in the West End.

From June 2008 until May 2009, Hamilton-Barritt starred in the UK tour of Flashdance the Musical, playing the lead role of Alex Owens. A new musical based on the 1983 film Flashdance, she starred alongside Noel Sullivan, Bernie Nolan and Bruno Langley. Later in 2009, she went on tour with Yusuf Islam (formerly known as Cat Stevens) performing songs from his musical Moonshadow. She provided backing vocals for the well-known artist in venues up and down the UK and Ireland, finishing the tour at the Royal Albert Hall.  In January 2010, she played Rizzo in Grease at the Piccadilly Theatre, alongside Noel Sullivan and Toby Anstis. From September 2010 until January 2011, she starred as Alex Owens in the original West End production of Flashdance. She went on to play the title role of Louise/Gypsy in Paul Kerryson's production of Gypsy at Leicester Curve in 2012 alongside Caroline O'Connor.

In 2013 Hamilton-Barritt appeared in A Chorus Line at the London Palladium as Diana Morales. She played the role of Daniela in Lin Manuel Miranda's In the Heights in 2014. The show won rave reviews opening at the Southwark Playhouse in London. The show was reworked and opened at The Kings Cross Theatre in the Autumn of 2015 where she returned to the role of Daniela while pregnant and retiring the role at eight months pregnant.

In September 2016 Hamilton-Barritt returned to work in the production of Murder Ballad at the Arts Theatre as the Narrator, alongside Kerry Ellis, Ramin Karimloo and Norman Bowman. In 2017 Victoria played the role of Kate in Michael John LaChuisa's The Wild Party at The Other Palace.

In 2019 Hamilton-Barritt starred in The View UpStairs playing the role of Inez at the Soho Theatre, in London from 18 July to 24 August.

In 2020, it was announced that Hamilton-Barritt would play the Stepmother in Andrew Lloyd Webber's Cinderella, alongside Carrie Hope Fletcher playing Cinderella.  Beginning in September 2021 at the Gillian Lynne Theatre in London until the production ran until in June 2022.

Film 
In 2009 Hamilton-Barritt appeared in A Bunch of Amateurs, starring Burt Reynolds and Imelda Staunton in which she played a Hollywood director's assistant. She also appeared in a BBC special of A Tale Of Two Cities which was narrated by Michael York.

Awards and nominations

References 

English stage actresses
Living people
Actresses from London
1982 births